Condalia microphylla is a perennial shrub of the family Rhamnaceae endemic to Argentina.

References

External links
 Imágenes de la sp.

microphylla
Flora of Argentina
Plants described in 1799
Taxa named by Antonio José Cavanilles